The Dominica Story: A History of the Island is a history book from 1975, written by famed Dominican historian Lennox Honychurch. Originally presented as a miniseries for Radio Dominica (now DBS Radio) in 1974, the inaugural edition covered every aspect of local history from prehistory up to the then-present (the island's 1967 Associated Statehood).

The book's first edition of 18 chapters was an immediate bestseller upon its release. A revised version with 21 chapters was printed in 1984. A commercial edition, this time with 24 chapters and focusing on local events in the 1980s and 1990s, was published in 1995 by the Caribbean imprint of Macmillan.

Chapters in the 1995 edition
 An Island of Fire
 The First Settlers
 The Kalinago - The "Island Carib"
 Columbus and Spain
 Land of Two Nations
 France Moves In
 The British in Dominica
 The Plantation
 The French Return
 The Fighting Maroons
 Revolution and Ransom
 The Last Maroon War
 Peace and Freedom
 The Years of Change
 An Unsettled Society
 New Men, New Energy
 Between Two Wars
 The Church
 Development and Welfare
 After God, The Land
 Statehood
 Towards Independence
 A Stormy Path
 Inventing a Nation

See also
From Columbus to Castro: A History of the Caribbean, by former Prime Minister of Trinidad and Tobago Eric Williams

1975 non-fiction books
Dominica literature
History of Dominica
Macmillan Publishers books
History books about Dominica